The West London derby is the name given to a football derby played between any two of Brentford, Chelsea, Fulham and Queens Park Rangers, all of whom are situated within West London.

This particular derby is less prominent than other such derbies in English football, owing to the teams frequently being in separate divisions. Chelsea did not face Fulham between 1986 and 2001, and have played Brentford only seven times since 1950. QPR did not face Brentford between 1966 and 2001, and did not play Chelsea between 1996 and 2008. The derby's most common match, Chelsea vs Fulham, has taken place 75 times. By contrast, the North London derby has been contested almost 200 times, and the Merseyside derby over 230 times. The 2011–2012 campaign was the first instance of three of the west London clubs competing in the top flight in the same season: Chelsea, Queens Park Rangers and Fulham. However, following Fulham's promotion from the EFL Championship at the end of the 2021–22 season, Chelsea, Brentford and Fulham will all appear in the top flight in the 2022–23 season.

According to the 2012 Football Rivalries Survey, Fulham regard Chelsea as their main rivals, QPR as their secondary rivals and then Brentford third. QPR fans identified Chelsea as their main rivals, Fulham second, Cardiff City third, Brentford and Stoke City joint fourth. Brentford fans chose Fulham as their main rivals, QPR as their secondary rivals and Chelsea as their third. Chelsea fans did not list any of the West London sides, instead selecting Arsenal, Tottenham Hotspur and Manchester United.

Summary

Brentford vs Chelsea derby
There is very little rivalry between Brentford and Chelsea, mainly due to the fact that they have been in different divisions for over 60 years. The only time that the two clubs ever shared a division was in the old First Division between 1935 and 1947, but despite the fact that both clubs are local to each other, it was never seen as a big rivalry to either side, as Chelsea had been in the Football League for a longer period of time than Brentford and had stronger rivalries with the likes of West Ham United, Arsenal and Tottenham Hotspur, whereas Brentford's main rivals are Fulham and QPR. Also Brentford developed a bigger sporting rivalry with Arsenal during the 1930s as both clubs vied for the title of being London's number one club.

The only bad feeling between the clubs was soon after Chelsea's foundation and admission into the Football League in 1905, the other West London clubs, including Brentford, lost many supporters and potential supporters to the only professional Football League club in the area. Other than that, Brentford and Chelsea have always had fairly good relations, even amongst supporters. In fact, during the 1970s many Chelsea fans would come down to Griffin Park if their club were playing away. Chelsea reserves played their games at Griffin Park, and occasionally a pre season friendly is staged between the two clubs.

Brentford and Chelsea met for the first time since 1950 on 27 January 2013 in an FA Cup 4th round tie at Griffin Park which ended in a 2–2 draw. Chelsea won the replay on 17 February 2013 at Stamford Bridge 4–0.

With Brentford gaining promotion to the Premier League for the 2021–22 season, the first time in 74 years, and Fulham's relegation the previous season, this was the only West London derby in the Premier League for the season. The first game was hosted at The Bees' new Brentford Community Stadium on October 16, 2021, which Chelsea won 1–0. Brentford won the return fixture at Stamford Bridge 1-4, with goals including a brace from Vitaly Janelt, and Christian Erikson's first goal for Brentford.

Their latest meeting was on 19 October 2022 when the teams drew 0-0 at Brentford Community Stadium in a Premier League contest.

Brentford vs Fulham derby
Fulham and Brentford have competed at the same level for a few periods in their history with the rivalry being fiercest during Fulham's descent to the lower leagues in the 1980s and early 90's. The two teams frequently competed between the 1920s and the 1950s in the Football League's various divisions. These games always drew bumper crowds and often caused tension on the pitch and the terraces. However, Fulham's fortunes on the pitch changed and they went on to play in the upper leagues for several decades until the two sides were to meet regularly again from 1980 onwards, a time when the rivalry was most heated. Fulham later went on to win the London Derby cup.

The two clubs spent a majority of seasons in the same division until the 1997–98 Division Two campaign, which ended with Brentford suffering relegation to Division Three. Despite Brentford's promotion straight back to Division Two as Division Three champions in the 1998–99 season, Fulham were crowned Division Two champions and ascended to the Premier League as Division One champions in 2001.

The 2014–15 Football League Championship season brought Brentford and Fulham together in the same division for the first time since 1998, following Brentford's promotion from League One and Fulham's relegation from the Premier League.

Prior to meeting in the league, the two sides were drawn together in the League Cup second round on 26 August 2014, with Fulham winning 1–0 at Griffin Park. It was the clubs' first meeting in any competitive fixture since a 2–0 league victory to Fulham on 11 April 1998.

In March 2023 the rivalry was said by the BBC to be "growing".

Brentford vs QPR derby 
As with Fulham, Brentford and QPR played each other frequently in local cup competitions and leagues from the foundation of both clubs. In 1920, the Football League absorbed many clubs from the Southern Football League, including Brentford and QPR, who competed in the old Third Division (South) regularly in the 1920s, until Brentford's rise up the leagues in the 1930s. After the Second World War, they spent practically every season in the same division for the next 20 years. At the time, the fixture was each side's biggest game of the season and always attracted a big crowd. However, in 1966, despite an opening day 6–1 thrashing of their local rivals, Brentford were ultimately relegated whilst QPR were promoted and went on to enjoy many seasons in the upper leagues.

However, the bad feeling between the clubs runs deeper than just locality. In 1967, QPR attempted a takeover of Brentford, which would have resulted in QPR moving into Griffin Park and Brentford F.C. ceasing to exist. The story infamously broke in the London press but Brentford supporters rallied to save their club. Since then, relations between the clubs have been frosty. The rivalry resumed in 2001 and continued for several seasons until Rangers were promoted. During this time, the rivalry was intensified by Brentford player Martin Rowlands leaving to join QPR. He then went on to kiss his badge on several occasions in front of the Brentford support when the two sides met in 2003 at Loftus Road.

The most recent meeting between Brentford and Queens Park Rangers was in 2021, with QPR winning 2–1 at Loftus Road on 17 February 2021.

Chelsea vs Fulham derby

In contrast to many rivalries in English football, such as the North London derby and the Merseyside derby, Chelsea and Fulham have spent much of their existence in separate divisions – between 1968 and 2001, the two were in the same division only five times – and have rarely been rivals for the major honours or played in many high-profile matches. This has greatly limited the scope for it to develop and actually served to weaken it.

In 1904, businessman Gus Mears approached the Fulham chairman Henry Norris about moving the club from their Craven Cottage home to the nearby Stamford Bridge Athletics Ground on the Fulham Road, which he had recently acquired. Norris declined following a dispute over the rent; as a result, Mears formed his own club to occupy the ground, Chelsea. Fulham thus had an indirect role in Chelsea's foundation. It also ensured that, despite Chelsea's name, there were two clubs in the Fulham Borough. The geographical proximity of the teams is the basis for the rivalry, rather than religious or political reasons, as with other derbies.

The first competitive match between the sides took place on 3 December 1910 in the Second Division, with a crowd of 35,000 at Craven Cottage watching Fulham win 1–0. The peak of the rivalry was arguably during the inter-war years and just after, when matches between the sides were always among the most popular (and most highly attended) on the fixture calendar. While both clubs were largely unsuccessful until the 1960s, they have since drifted apart and the significance of matches between them has correspondingly declined. Chelsea enjoyed successful spells during the 1960s and 1970s, and again from the mid-1990s to the present day, while Fulham spent much of that period in the lower divisions of the Football League. As a caveat to that, when Chelsea and Fulham did meet in league games in the 1970s and 1980s, the attendances were always among the highest for the season, with the lack of regular matches often making the derby more eagerly anticipated.

The reduced number of encounters saw Chelsea fans develop rivalries with other teams, notably Leeds United, other London clubs such as Tottenham Hotspur and Arsenal. Fulham also formed rivalries with other teams from London like Brentford and QPR. All these reduced the prominence of the West London Derby. That is less true for Fulham fans, with the fact that their nearest neighbours have been more successful ensuring that matches against Chelsea retain a David vs Goliath factor. Fulham returned to the top division in 2001, putting the clubs in the same division for the first time since 1983–84.

On 19 March 2006, Fulham beat Chelsea 1–0 for the first time in 27 years with a goal from Luis Boa Morte. The match was marred by controversy and crowd trouble and has arguably rekindled the derby somewhat. Chelsea gained revenge for this defeat on 23 September with a 2–0 win at Craven Cottage, in which Frank Lampard struck twice. Thankfully, there was little trouble before and after the game, due to appeals for calm from managers and players of both clubs and a much higher than normal police presence, to deter fans from entering the pitch after the game. Two of the last games to be played at Stamford Bridge have both been close contests.  On 30 December 2006, they played out a 2–2 draw, with Carlos Bocanegra getting a late equaliser for Fulham (earlier in the match Moritz Volz had scored the 15,000th goal in Premier League history. On 29 September 2007, they settled for a 0–0 draw.  This draw was Avram Grant's first West London derby in charge of Chelsea and the same for Lawrie Sanchez of Fulham. During the 2008–09 season, Chelsea defeated Fulham 3–1 under Guus Hiddink, with goals from Nicolas Anelka, Florent Malouda and Didier Drogba, with Anelka's goal coming after just 51 seconds. In the 2009–10 season, Chelsea defeated Fulham at Craven Cottage with a 2–0 win, thanks to goals from Didier Drogba and Nicolas Anelka. The win was Carlo Ancelotti's first London derby. In the 2011–12 season, both teams drew their home and away fixtures. In the 2012–13 season, both sides played out a 0–0 draw at Stamford Bridge, Chelsea won the reverse fixture 3–0 away at Craven Cottage. Chelsea won the home clash 2–0 with goals from Oscar and Mikel John Obi on 21 September 2013. On 1 March 2013, Chelsea won 3–1 at Craven Cottage with André Schürrle netting a hat-trick for Chelsea. Fulham finished in 19th place at the end of the 2013–14 Premier League season and were relegated to the Football League Championship for the 2014–15 season, meaning that the two sides would sit in different divisions again after 13 years in the same division.

Their latest result was on 12 January 2023 when Fulham defeated Chelsea 2–1 at Craven Cottage in a Premier League match. That match was the second time that Fulham had beaten Chelsea in the Premier League and the first since 2006.

Chelsea vs QPR derby
Despite QPR being members of the Football League since 1920, the two sides did not meet in a competitive match until 1968–69, when Rangers made their debut in the First Division. Overall, Chelsea do not consider QPR rivals due to the size difference of the two clubs. Their first match took place on 14 September 1968; Chelsea won 4–0. Since then, the sides have met a further 45 times, making it the most common West London derby since the 1960s. The clubs developed a rivalry in the 1960s and 1970s when both were playing top-flight football and competing to be among London's top sides, with Chelsea winning the FA Cup, Cup Winners' Cup and League Cup, and Rangers winning the League Cup and finishing as league runners-up by a single point.

Many QPR fans' favourite game against Chelsea was a 6–0 victory on Easter Monday in 1986. Chelsea were second in the league table at the time, and the result all but ended their title challenge. During this period, the clubs were relatively evenly matched, although Chelsea were always considered the bigger club, with both occasionally dropping into the Second Division in the late 1970s and early 1980s, so they met in almost every season. The teams met in a competitive match for the first time since 1996, when drawn to face each other in the FA Cup 3rd Round on 5 January 2008. Chelsea won 1–0 thanks to a first-half own goal by Lee Camp.

In recent times, Chelsea have become one of the dominant forces in the English game, whereas QPR were in the second tier of English football for many years. The links between the two clubs have been maintained through numerous on-loan players; two of Chelsea's best youth team players joined QPR on loan for the 2006–07 season. These players were Jimmy Smith and Michael Mancienne. Mancienne renewed his loan for the 2007–08 season.

QPR and Chelsea have competed in two pre-season friendlies since the turn of the century. The most recent was in 2003 when Chelsea thrashed a QPR Legends XI 7–0. On 28 July 2001, QPR stunned the £50 million Chelsea line-up by beating them 3–1. Jesper Grønkjær gave Chelsea a first-half lead, but QPR got an equaliser from Leroy Griffiths and then took lead from a long range effort by Karl Connolly. QPR confirmed the win when Gavin Peacock, also a former Chelsea player, scored late on.

Mirroring Chelsea's purchase by Russian billionaire Roman Abramovich, QPR have received investment from Flavio Briatore, Bernie Ecclestone and Lakshmi Mittal. The fact that the Mittal family, who own a 20% stake in the club, are reputed to be five times as rich as Abramovich has seen QPR fans dub themselves the world's richest club.

On 30 August 2009, Chelsea were drawn against QPR in the third round of the 2009–10 Football League Cup, which saw Chelsea win the game 1–0 thanks to a goal from Salomon Kalou.

On 23 October 2011, Chelsea lost 1–0 to a newly promoted QPR in the first Premier League match between the sides since 1996. In a feisty encounter players clashed on several occasions, with nine Chelsea players and two QPR booked, with Chelsea's José Bosingwa and Didier Drogba being sent off. Heiðar Helguson scored the only goal of the match through a penalty. Chelsea manager André Villas-Boas was later charged by the FA for criticizing the performance of the referee Chris Foy, as he believed many of the big decisions made were incorrect. Chelsea were fined £20,000 by the FA for not controlling their players, who picked up a record number of bookings in a single match in the Premier League era, and their manager was fined £12,000 for his comments on the referee in addition to being cautioned for future conduct. In the aftermath of the match, a video was posted on YouTube showing Chelsea and England captain John Terry allegedly racially abusing Anton Ferdinand, for which he has been charged with a racially aggravated public order offence. Chelsea then drew QPR again in the FA Cup, winning 1–0 at Loftus Road thanks to a Juan Mata penalty.

On 29 April 2012, Chelsea exacted revenge on QPR in the reverse league fixture with a ruthless 6–1 victory, with four goals being scored in a nightmare opening 25 minutes for Rangers. Fernando Torres became the first player in over 20 years to score a hat-trick in this West London Derby. It was QPR, however, who had the last laugh. After holding Chelsea to a 0–0 draw at Loftus Road on 15 September 2012, they went on to beat Chelsea 1–0 in the reverse fixture on 2 January 2013 at Stamford Bridge, with the goal coming from former Chelsea player Shaun Wright-Phillips, ending a 30-year wait for a win at the Bridge for Rangers. QPR finished the 2012–13 Premier League season in last place, however, and were relegated to the Championship. They were promoted to the Premier League again for the 2014–15 season after winning the 2014 Football League Championship play-off Final 1–0 against Derby County at Wembley Stadium on 24 May 2014. On 12 April 2015, Chelsea beat QPR 0–1 with Cesc Fàbregas scoring the goal in the 88th minute. This sent Chelsea seven points clear at the top of the table ahead of Arsenal. QPR remained in the relegation zone, two points away from safety.

Fulham vs QPR derby
The origins of a rivalry between Fulham and QPR date back before Chelsea were formed. In 1892 the two teams met at Kensal Rise to play in the West London Cup Final. QPR were 3–2 victors and won their first piece of silverware. For the next few seasons QPR continued to win the cup, whilst Fulham won The West London League. In recent times, however, QPR and Fulham derbies are not common as both teams have been in different divisions for all but two seasons since the Premier League first started in 1992. As two very similar clubs in size, history and fan base, derbies, are at times, fiercer and more competitive than those against Chelsea, sometimes leading to cases of crowd trouble such as a riot between the two sets of fans in 1999.

From 2002 until 2004, QPR and Fulham were closer than they had ever been when the two clubs shared Loftus Road while Craven Cottage was being redeveloped. This added extra spice to a derby had they drawn each other in the cup, especially had QPR been the away team at their own ground.

The matches during the 2000–01 season both ended up being 2–0 to Fulham. The game at Loftus Road saw Richard Langley and Clarke Carlisle – two of QPR's best players – seriously injured in the game and both were out for 18 months with cruciate ligament injuries; this was vital for QPR's descent into the third tier for the first time in 34 years.
 
QPR were promoted to the Premier League for the 2011–12 season, meaning the derby would take place for the first time in over ten years and in the Premier League for the first time. The first match finished in a 6–0 victory for Fulham, with Andy Johnson bagging a hat-trick.

The return fixture between the two sides is sure to ignite the rivalry as QPR have recently come under the managerial guidance of Mark Hughes, who was the manager of Fulham the previous season and left under controversial circumstances, citing the clubs' lack of ambition and stature as his reasons. With a last-minute controversial switch by Bobby Zamora to the Hoops, at the end of the January transfer window, Fulham's first return to their former temporary ground was a spicy affair. Samba Diakité was sent off in the first half, and Zamora's replacement, Pavel Pogrebnyak scored the only goal of the game, meaning Fulham had done the double over QPR in the league. The following season, Rangers were on a dismal run of form without a win in seventeen games and looking certain for relegation. When the two side met on 15 December 2012 at Loftus Road, it was Adel Taarabt who took the Hoops to their first win of the season over their bitter rivals in a strong 2–1 victory. Fulham won the reverse fixture 3–2 when the two sides met on 1 April 2013 at Craven Cottage. In 2015–16, the clubs met once more in the Championship, and Fulham convincingly won both fixtures, in both cases being 3–0 up before half-time.

In the 2019–20 season, the two teams played the same division again since Fulham were relegated after finishing 19th in the Premier League. However, at the end of the season, Fulham were promoted back to the Premier League after finishing 4th in the table and winning the EFL Championship play-off Final.

Their latest meeting was a 2–0 victory for Fulham at Loftus Road on 2 April 2022 in a Championship match.

Results

Aggregated results

Brentford vs Chelsea

Last two results

Brentford vs Fulham

Last two results

Brentford vs QPR

Last two results

Chelsea vs Fulham

Last two results

Chelsea vs QPR

Last two results

Fulham vs QPR

Last two results

Notable matches

QPR 3–2 Fulham (1892) – The West London Cup Final at Kensal Rise saw League winners Fulham take on the emerging QPR. Fulham were favourites, but QPR were not to be underestimated. They were just beginning to establish themselves as one of West London's top sides. Fulham had firmly established themselves as the best team in the area, because they had won the West London League for two years running. Fulham raced into a 2–0 lead and held it at half-time. QPR somehow managed to pull it back and won their first piece of silverware. This is seen as the first famous derby.
Brentford 6–1 QPR (21 August 1965) – Brentford stormed to an opening day win at Griffin Park, however fortunes for both clubs changed shortly after. It was the last meeting between the two sides at Griffin Park for 35 years in a season which resulted in the relegation of Brentford in spite of this great start. In early 1967, QPR attempted and failed to take over Brentford and Griffin Park, which would have resulted in the closure of Brentford FC.
QPR 2–4 Chelsea (21 February 1970) – In 1970, Chelsea and QPR were drawn to face each other in the FA Cup quarter-finals. Chelsea's Alan Hudson described it as a "fantastic draw", owing to the rivalry between the two clubs. To add further spice, QPR were fielding two former Chelsea players, Terry Venables and Barry Bridges, as well as their star striker, Rodney Marsh. In an entertaining match, despite the poor pitch, Chelsea were 2–0 up within eight minutes thanks to Peter Osgood and David Webb, before a twice-taken Venables penalty put Rangers back in contention. As Rangers threatened to equalise, Osgood scored twice more to complete his hat-trick and put the result beyond doubt; Bridges grabbed a late consolation for his side. Chelsea would ultimately go on to win the cup that season.
QPR 6–0 Chelsea (31 March 1986) – Chelsea had been title challengers for most of the season, but went into the match having lost 4–0 to West Ham United two days previously; this result all but ended their title challenge. Rangers striker Gary Bannister grabbed a hat-trick and fellow striker John Byrne scored twice to secure their biggest ever win over Chelsea. Towards the end of the game Chelsea's David Speedie was sent off for punching a QPR player.
Brentford 4–0 Fulham (26 April 1992) – In a Sunday morning fixture, Brentford secured promotion to the second tier of English football for the first time since 1954. Brentford raced into a four-goal lead by half time, including two goals in a minute. As the commentator on the day quoted, it was "raining goals at Griffin Park".
Chelsea 1–0 Fulham (14 April 2002) – The most important match between the clubs in recent years, an FA Cup semi-final at Villa Park. Newly promoted Fulham went into the match as underdogs, attempting to reach their first major final since 1975. By contrast, Chelsea were aiming for their third final in five years. John Terry's deflected shot just before half-time proved to be the difference between the sides, sending Chelsea into the final.
QPR 1–0 Brentford (11 November 2003) – A match steeped in controversy as throughout the game ex-Bee Martin Rowlands goaded the Brentford fans and at full-time, instead of celebrating with the home fans, he and several other QPR players walked over to the away end and made inciteful gestures and goaded the Brentford fans.
Fulham 1–0 Chelsea (19 March 2006) – Fulham secured their first win over Chelsea since 1979 with a goal from Luís Boa Morte in a heated and controversial match. Champions-elect Chelsea had a Didier Drogba goal disallowed for a handball and William Gallas sent off, with the latter incident sparking a mass brawl of the players. After the final whistle, both sets of fans invaded the pitch, which led to some clashes and arrests.
 Fulham 6–0 QPR (2 October 2011) – The first competitive match between the two teams in a decade and the first ever in the top flight. Much hype was made in the build-up, but an Andy Johnson hat-trick, goals from Clint Dempsey, Bobby Zamora and a Danny Murphy penalty annihilated Rangers. Adel Taarabt, who had been substituted at half-time, was famously seen waiting for a bus in Fulham Palace Road during the second half.
 QPR 1–0 Chelsea (23 October 2011) – QPR secured a first victory over Chelsea since 1995, courtesy of an early Heiðar Helguson penalty. Chelsea were down to nine men inside 40 minutes after José Bosingwa and Didier Drogba were both sent off, for denying a goalscoring opportunity and a reckless tackle respectively. Chelsea captain John Terry was accused of racially abusing QPR defender Anton Ferdinand during the match, for which he win stood trial in July 2012, being found not guilty. As a result of these allegations, Terry was stripped of the England captaincy by the FA. England manager Fabio Capello resigned in protest against Terry's sacking.
 Chelsea 6–1 QPR (29 April 2012) – Chelsea avenged their previous 1–0 league defeat to QPR, with Fernando Torres scoring his first hat-trick for the club.
 Chelsea 0–1 QPR (2 January 2013) – QPR secured their first win at Stamford Bridge since March 1979 thanks to a 78th-minute winner from Shaun Wright-Phillips. Chelsea went into the game in fourth place and on the back of a four-match winning run while QPR where bottom of the table with just 10 points from 20 games, eight points from safety and without an away win in the league since November 2011, all of which combined to make it one of the most surprising results in the recent history of this fixture and of the 2012–13 season.
 Brentford 2–2 Chelsea (27 January 2013) – In the first game between Chelsea and Brentford since 1950, Brentford shocked Chelsea at Griffin Park, twice going ahead through goals from Marcello Trotta and  Harry Forrester. Oscar, however, first levelled before Fernando Torres secured a replay at Stamford Bridge with an equaliser seven minutes from time. Chelsea won the replay 4–0.
 Brentford 0–1 Fulham (26 August 2014) – In the first game between Fulham and Brentford since 1998, under pressure Fulham manager Felix Magath secured a win in the League Cup. The only goal of the game came from Ross McCormack.
Fulham 0–2 Brentford (20 June 2020) – In the first Championship game after the break in the season due to the COVID-19 pandemic, Brentford scored 2 late goals to move within 1 point of Fulham, starting a long winning run. The two teams finished level on points and battled for promotion at Wembley. (see below)
Brentford 1–2 Fulham (aet) (4 August 2020) – An empty Wembley Stadium played host to the Championship Play-Off Final. Fulham won promotion to the Premier League for the 2020-21 season. All the goals came from extra time: first 2 from Fulham, both from Joe Bryan (including an outrageous free kick) and Brentford scored a consolation through Henrik Dalsgaard in what was effectively the last kick of the game.
 Chelsea 1–4 Brentford (2 April 2022) – In the third contest between the two clubs this season with the previous 2 being Chelsea victories, Brentford pulled off a shocking victory at Stamford Bridge. After an uneventful first half, Chelsea centre-back Antonio Rüdiger opened the scoring with a stunning strike from distance. Brentford responded with 4 unanswered goals by Vitaly Janelt, Christian Eriksen, Janelt again and then Yoane Wissa. It was Chelsea’s largest defeat of the season so far. This was also Brentford’s first win against Chelsea since 1939.
 Fulham 3–2 Brentford (20 August 2022) – For the first time ever, Fulham met Brentford in the top flight of English football. Fulham got off to a flying start, with Bobby Decordova-Reid scoring after just 44 seconds. Fulham doubled their lead 20 minutes into the game, through a Joao Palhinha header from a corner. Brentford pegged Fulham back with a Christian Norgaard volley from a corner, two minutes before half time. Brentford thought they had equalised, twice, after Ivan Toney put the ball in the back of the Fulham net, but both goals were disallowed as Toney had strayed offside. Toney did end up scoring the equaliser for Brentford after 71 minutes. The game was looking to end in a stalemate, before Aleksandar Mitrovic scored a 90th minute winner with a header at the back post. This goal meant Fulham had won a top flight London derby for the first time in 25 attempts, when they beat West Ham United at Craven Cottage in 2014.
 Fulham 2–1 Chelsea (12 January 2023) – This was the first time that Fulham had beaten Chelsea since 2006. Former Chelsea player Willian opened the scoring in the 25th minute, before Kalidou Koulibaly scored an equaliser at the start of the second half. However, in the 73rd minute Carlos Vinícius scored the winner which secured the win for the home side.

Crossing the divide
A list of players who have played for or managed at least two out of Brentford, Chelsea, Fulham and QPR.

Brentford and QPR
Martin Allen – played for QPR, managed Brentford.
Herbert Ashford – first Brentford, then QPR. Born in Fulham.
Yoann Barbet – first Brentford, then QPR.
Jake Bidwell – first Brentford, then QPR.
Marcus Bean – first QPR, then Brentford.
James Bellingham – first QPR, then Brentford.
 Graham Benstead – first QPR, then Brentford.
Stan Bowles - first QPR, then Brentford.
 George Bristow – first Brentford, then QPR.
  Nikki Bull – first QPR, then Brentford.
  Steve Burke – loaned to Brentford.
Jackie Burns – first QPR, then Brentford.
 Tommy Cain – first QPR, then Brentford.
DJ Campbell – first Brentford, then QPR.
 Tommy Cheetham – first for Brentford, then QPR.
 Gary Cooper – loaned to Brentford.
 Willie Cross – first QPR, then Brentford.
 John Docherty – first Brentford, then QPR.
 Fred Durrant – first Brentford, then QPR.
 Jack Durston – first QPR, then Brentford.
 Lloyd Evans – first QPR, then Brentford.
 Dave Ewing – first Brentford, then QPR.
 Les Ferdinand – loaned to Brentford.
 Mark Fleming – first QPR, then Brentford.
 George Francis – first for Brentford, then QPR and back to Brentford.
 Allan Glover – first QPR, loaned to Brentford by West Bromwich Albion, then signed permanently two years later.
 Patsy Hendren – first for QPR, then two spells with Brentford.
 Ian Holloway – first Brentford, then QPR. Later managed QPR.
 Mark Hill – first QPR, then Brentford.
 Bill Keech – first QPR, then Brentford.
 Jim Langley – first Brentford, then QPR.
 Mark Lazarus – two spells at QPR, on to Brentford and back to QPR.
 Billy McAdams – first Brentford, then QPR.
 Andrew McCulloch – first for QPR, then Brentford.
 Tom McGovern – first Brentford, then QPR.
 George McLeod – first Brentford, then QPR.
 Thomas McKenzie – first Brentford, then QPR.
 Archie Mitchell – first QPR, then Brentford.
 Sam Morris – first QPR, then Brentford.
 Denny Mundee – first QPR, then Brentford.
 Richard Pacquette – first QPR, then Brentford.
 John Pearson – first for Brentford, then QPR.
 Edward Price – first Brentford, then QPR.
 Bill Pointon – first QPR, then Brentford.
 Keith Pritchett – first QPR, then Brentford.
Martin Rowlands – first Brentford, then QPR, later QPR captain.
 Harry Salt – first QPR, then Brentford.
 Kenny Sansom – first QPR, then Brentford.
 Thomas Shufflebotham – first Brentford, then QPR.
 Barry Silkman – first Brentford, then QPR.
 Henry Simons – first Brentford, then QPR.
Andy Sinton – first Brentford, then QPR.
 Steve Slade – loaned to Brentford.
 George Smith – first for Brentford, then QPR.
 Ian Stewart – first for QPR, then loaned to Brentford from Portsmouth.
 George Stewart – first for Brentford, then QPR.
 Nigel Smith – first for QPR, then Brentford.
 Sidney Sugden – first QPR, then Brentford.
 Gordon Sweetzer – first QPR, then two spells with Brentford.
 Steven Tom – first QPR, then Brentford.
 Jim Towers – first for Brentford, then QPR.
 Rowan Vine – loaned to Brentford from Portsmouth, then signed permanently for QPR. Loaned to Brentford by QPR.
Mark Warburton – first managed Brentford, then managed QPR.
 Billy Yenson – first QPR, then Brentford.
 Bert Young – first for Brentford, then QPR.

Brentford and Fulham
Ralph Allen – first Fulham, then Brentford.
George Bertram – first Fulham, then Brentford.
 Paul Brooker – first Fulham, then Brentford.
 Wayne Brown – loaned to Brentford.
 David Button – first Brentford, then Fulham
 Dave Carlton – first Fulham, then Brentford.
 Roger Cross – first Brentford, then QPR and back to Brentford.
 Danny Cullip – first Fulham, then Brentford.
 Bill Dodgin, Jr. – played for and managed Fulham, then managed Brentford.
 Maurice Edelston – first Fulham, then Brentford.
 Harry Fletcher – first Fulham, then Brentford.
 John Fraser – first for Fulham, then Brentford.
 Darren Freeman – first for Fulham, then Brentford.
 Tom Garnish – first Brentford, then Fulham.
 Leonard Geard – first Fulham, then Brentford.
 Ellis Green – first Brentford, then Fulham.
 Tom Garnish – first Brentford, then Fulham.
 Kelly Haag – first Brentford, then Fulham.
 Jimmy Hill – first Brentford, then Fulham.
 Gus Hurdle – first Fulham, then Brentford.
 Terry Hurlock – first Brentford, then Fulham.
 Francis Joseph – first Brentford, then Fulham.
 Junior Lewis – first a schoolboy at Brentford, then Fulham and back to Brentford.
 Archie Macaulay – first Brentford, then Fulham.
 Tony Mahoney – first Fulham, then Brentford.
 John McCourt – first Brentford, then Fulham.
Robert Milsom – loaned to Brentford.
 Frank Morrad – first Fulham, then Brentford.
 Abe Morris – first Fulham, then Brentford.
 Bernard Newcombe – first Fulham, then Brentford.
 Fred Nidd – first Brentford, then Fulham.
 Trevor Porter – first Fulham, then Brentford.
 Darren Pratley – loaned to Brentford twice.
 Johnny Price – first Brentford, then Fulham.
 Paul Priddy – first Fulham, then three spells with Brentford.
 Dennis Rampling – first Fulham, then Brentford.
 Bertie Rosier – first Brentford, then Fulham.
 John Richardson – first Brentford, then Fulham.
 Joe Ryalls – first Fulham, then Brentford.
John Salako – first Fulham, then Brentford.
 Steve Scrivens – loaned to Brentford.
 Paul Shrubb – first Fulham, then Brentford.
 John South – first Fulham, then Brentford.
 Les Strong – loaned to Brentford.
 Jeff Taylor – first Fulham, then Brentford.
 Bob Thomas – first Brentford, then Fulham.
 Marcello Trotta – loaned to Brentford twice.
 Ernie Watkins – first Brentford, then Fulham.
 Paul Watson – first Fulham, then Brentford.
 Tom Wilson – first Fulham, then Brentford.
 Alexander Wood – first Brentford, then Fulham.
 Viv Woodward  –  first Fulham, then Brentford.

Brentford and Chelsea
 Joe Allon – first Chelsea, then Brentford.
 George Anderson – first Brentford, then Chelsea.
 Micky Block – first Chelsea, then Brentford.
 Johnny Brooks – first Chelsea, then Brentford.
 Neil Clement – loaned to Brentford.
 Jack Cock – first Brentford, then Chelsea.
 Nick Colgan – loaned to Brentford.
 Alan Dickens – loaned to Brentford.
 Micky Droy – first Chelsea, then Brentford.
 Lee Frost – loaned to Brentford and signed permanently two years later.
 Bill Garner – first Chelsea, then Brentford.
 Gareth Hall – first Chelsea, then Brentford.
 Ron Harris – first Chelsea, then Brentford. Was also assistant manager at Brentford.
 Stewart Houston – first Chelsea, then Brentford.
 Iori Jenkins – first Chelsea, then Brentford.
 Gary Johnson – first Chelsea, then Brentford.
 Keith Jones – first Chelsea, then Brentford.
 Roger Joseph – first Brentford, then Chelsea.
 Joe Keenan – loaned to Brentford.
 Joel Kitamirike – loaned to Brentford.
 Keith Lawrence – first Chelsea, then Brentford.
 Tommy Lawton – first Chelsea, then Brentford.
 Colin Lee – first Chelsea, then Brentford.
 Bill Livingstone – first Chelsea, then Brentford.
 Michael Maskell – first Chelsea, then Brentford.
 Josh McEachran – first Chelsea, then Brentford
 Andy Myers – first Chelsea, then Brentford.
 Alan Nelmes – first Chelsea, then Brentford.
 Eric Parsons – first Chelsea, then Brentford.
 Johnny Paton – first Chelsea, then Brentford.
 Adrian Pettigrew – loaned to Brentford.
 Philip Priest – loaned to Brentford.
 Graham Rix – loaned to Brentford by Arsenal, signed permanently for Chelsea.
 George Saville – loaned to Brentford.
 Mel Scott – first Chelsea, then Brentford.
 Fred Taylor – first Chelsea, then Brentford.
 Sid Tickridge – first Chelsea, then Brentford.
 Sam Tillen – first Chelsea, then Brentford.
 Brian Turner – first Chelsea, then Brentford.
 Graham Wilkins – first Chelsea, then Brentford.
 Stephen Wilkins – first Chelsea, then Brentford.

Brentford, Chelsea and Fulham
 Jimmy Bowie – first Chelsea, then Fulham, then Brentford and later returned to Fulham.
 Peter Buchanan – first Chelsea, then Fulham, then Brentford.
 Ron Greenwood – first Brentford, then Chelsea, then Fulham.
 Barry Lloyd – first Chelsea, then Fulham, then Brentford.
 Gerry Peyton – first Fulham, then played for Brentford and Chelsea on loan from Everton. Signed permanently for Brentford after leaving Everton.
 Steve Sidwell – first Brentford, then Chelsea, then Fulham.
 Billy Sperrin – guested for Fulham and Chelsea during the Second World War, then signed permanently for Brentford in 1949.

Chelsea, Fulham and QPR
Roy Bentley – won the league title as a striker with Chelsea in 1955 and moved on to Fulham a year later, where he was converted into a defender. Upon leaving Fulham, Bentley spent two years with QPR.
Bobby Campbell – managed Fulham between 1976 and 1980, and later Chelsea between 1988 and 1991. Also coached QPR in the 1980s.
Paul Parker – started his career at Fulham before being sold to QPR (where we went on to start for England in the 1990 World Cup) also played four games for Chelsea in 1997.
Dave Sexton – having been a coach at Fulham during the 1960s, Sexton managed Chelsea and QPR during the 1970s. He won the FA Cup and European Cup Winners' Cup in successive seasons with Chelsea and took Rangers to within a point of the league title; as such he is regarded by both clubs as one of their greatest ever managers.
Clive Walker – winger who played for all three West London clubs.
Ray Wilkins – started his playing career at Chelsea, and later played for and managed QPR as well as managing Fulham. He also had a stint as assistant manager to Gianluca Vialli at Chelsea. He again became the assistant manager under Luiz Felipe Scolari after the departure of Steve Clarke. He continued to perform the role under Guus Hiddink and Carlo Ancelotti until his contract was terminated without notice on 11 November 2010. He also had a stint as assistant head coach to René Meulensteen at Fulham, but was sacked after less than two months in the role along with Meulensteen and Alan Curbishley.

Chelsea and QPR
Clive Allen – first QPR, then Chelsea.
José Bosingwa – played for Chelsea then moved to QPR.
Barry Bridges – Chelsea to QPR via Birmingham City.
Gary Chivers – Chelsea to QPR via Swansea City.
Jake Clarke-Salter – Chelsea to QPR.
Tommy Docherty – managed Chelsea in the 1960s. Two spells as QPR manager.
Rhys Evans – loaned from Chelsea to QPR.
Mark Falco – on loan to Chelsea and later had a spell with QPR.
Mike Fillery – from Chelsea to QPR.
Paul Furlong – from Chelsea to QPR.
Allan Harris – from Chelsea to QPR.
John Hollins – played and managed both clubs.
Tommy Langley – from Chelsea to QPR.
Michael Mancienne – spent two loan spells at QPR.
Gavin Peacock – played for Chelsea in the 1990s, either side of spells at QPR.
Loïc Rémy – signed by QPR in January 2013, bought by Chelsea in August 2014.
Ben Sahar – came to QPR on loan from Chelsea.
Scott Sinclair – came on loan to QPR from Chelsea.
Jimmy Smith – came on loan to QPR from Chelsea.
Nigel Spackman – Chelsea then QPR via Liverpool.
John Spencer – Chelsea to QPR.
William Steer – first QPR, then Chelsea.
Terry Venables – player at Chelsea then transferred to QPR via Tottenham Hotspur in 1969. Managed QPR in the 1980s.
Ian Watson – moved from Chelsea to QPR in the mid-1960s.
David Webb – from Chelsea to QPR. Managed Chelsea in 1993.
Roy Wegerle – from Chelsea to QPR via loan to Swindon Town and permanent move to Luton Town.
Steve Wicks – from Chelsea to QPR via Derby County. Later returned to QPR after a spell at Crystal Palace.
Shaun Wright-Phillips – from Chelsea to QPR via Manchester City.

Chelsea and Fulham
Dave Beasant – after leaving Chelsea in 1992, Beasant played for a further 10 clubs before ending up as a reserve goalkeeper/coach at Fulham in 2003. He retired from his playing capacity a year later without actually playing a game, and is still employed by the club as a coach.
Wayne Bridge – was on loan at Fulham from Chelsea during the second half of the 2005–06 season.
Gordon Davies – first at Fulham, then Chelsea.
John Dempsey – first at Fulham, then Chelsea.
Slaviša Jokanović - first at Chelsea, then managed Fulham
Damien Duff – first at Chelsea, Newcastle (see article Tyne–Wear derby), then Fulham (formerly with Blackburn Rovers)
Bjarne Goldbæk – first at Chelsea, then Fulham.
Eiður Guðjohnsen – first at Chelsea, then Fulham.
Jon Harley – first at Chelsea, then Fulham.
Gaël Kakuta – was on loan at Fulham from Chelsea during the second half of the 2010–11 season.
Ray Lewington – first at Chelsea, then Fulham.
Ruben Loftus-Cheek – played for Chelsea since 2014, was on loan at Fulham during 2020–21 season.
Scott Parker - first at Chelsea, then Fulham. Former Fulham manager.
Ian Pearce – first at Chelsea, then Fulham, via Blackburn Rovers and West Ham.
Lucas Piazón – was on loan at Fulham from Chelsea during the 2016–17 and 2017–18 seasons.
Robert Savage – first at Fulham, then Chelsea. Not to be confused with modern-day player Robbie Savage.
André Schürrle – first at Chelsea, then Fulham on loan.
Mark Schwarzer – first at Fulham, then Chelsea.
Jimmy Sharp – two spells with Fulham, then Chelsea, then back to Fulham.
Alexey Smertin – signed with Fulham in early 2007, having played for (among other Premiership clubs) Chelsea.
Willian – first at Chelsea, then Fulham.

Fulham and QPR
Dean Coney – Fulham and QPR striker. Part of the deal that took Paul Parker to QPR.
Lee Cook – QPR winger transferred to Fulham 2007/8 season.
Joe Fidler – First Fulham, then QPR.
Rodney Marsh – Started off at Fulham, before becoming a QPR legend and then moved to Manchester City  before coming back to play for the maverick Fulham side, and England. Returned to Fulham for a brief loan spell in 1976.
Stefan Johansen – loaned to QPR from Fulham in 2020–21.
Andrew Johnson – Fulham to QPR in 2012.
Stephen Kelly – played for QPR in 2003.  Joined Fulham in 2009.
Thomas Leigh – First Fulham, then QPR.
Heiðar Helguson – Fulham and QPR striker.
Mark Hughes – Managed Fulham in the 2010/11 season before leaving due to a desire to win trophies. Signed as QPR manager the following season in January.
Paul Parker – Played over 100 games for both clubs.
Zesh Rehman – Moved from Fulham to QPR in 2006.
Tony Sealy – Small but quick striker. Top scorer as QPR won promotion in 1982/83. Later moved to Fulham.
Matt Smith – First Fulham, then QPR
Ernie Symes – First Fulham, then QPR.
Adel Taarabt – Loaned from QPR to Fulham in 2013
Bobby Zamora – Played for Fulham until signing for QPR on a January transfer in 2012.
Fulham, QPR and Brentford
 Dave Metchick – first Fulham, then QPR, then Brentford.
 David Nelson – Fulham, Brentford, QPR.
 Tony Parks – First Brentford, loaned to QPR and then signed for Fulham
 Calum Willock – Loaned from Fulham to QPR, later signed for Brentford in 2006.

See also

London derbies
South London derby
North London derby
East London derby
Local derby
Sports rivalry
Local derbies in the United Kingdom

Notes

References 
 Soccerbase
 www.footballderbies.com
 QPR Report

Brentford F.C.
Chelsea F.C.
Fulham F.C.
Queens Park Rangers F.C.
London derbies
England football derbies